Loretta Kelly is an Australian Aboriginal law academic, specialising in  Aboriginal dispute resolution.

She is of Gumbaynggirr and Dungutti descent and has traditional land at Corindi.

She is currently a senior lecturer at Southern Cross University.

Selected works 
 Indigenous Human Rights
 Resolving Indigenous Disputes - Land conflict and beyond

References

External links
 institutional homepage

Academic staff of Southern Cross University
Living people
Year of birth missing (living people)
Indigenous Australian academics
Indigenous Australian women academics
Australian women academics